The 15th Waffen Grenadier Division of the SS (1st Latvian) was an Infantry Division of the Waffen-SS during World War II. It was formed in February 1943, and together with its sister unit, the 19th Waffen Grenadier Division of the SS (2nd Latvian) formed the Latvian Legion.

World War II
After forming of Latvian Police Battalions in Reichskommissariat Ostland, Heinrich Himmler formed Latvian legion (Lettische SS-Freiwilligen-Legion) in January 1943. In February 1943 Lettische SS-Freiwilligen-Division was formed which later received the numerical designation 15. The Legion was renamed the Lettische SS-Freiwilligen-Brigade, with the numerical designation added soon after.

Unlawful conscription of Latvians for military service by the Germans was based on Alfred Rosenberg's compulsory labor decree of 19 December 1941. It was carried out by Department of Labor of the Latvian Self Administration, commencing in early 1943 with the compulsory recruitment of Latvian citizens born between 1919 and 1924. The 15th Waffen SS, together with the 19th Waffen Grenadier Division of the SS (2nd Latvian) formed the Latvian Legion.

The 15th Waffen SS was swept up in the chaos of the collapse of the Eastern Front and lost much of its manpower fighting in districts surrounding Leningrad (Ostrov, Novosokolniki and Novgorod Oblast). In September 1944 the surviving elements of the division were sent by boat to Danzig. The division fought on the Pomeranian Wall defences and then retreated through Pomerania and Germany to Berlin.

Part of the division with a total of 824 men under Waffen-Standartenführer Vilis Janums, surrendered 27 April 1945 to the advancing Americans at Güterglück near the Elbe River. Other elements of the division, amounting to approximately 4,500 men, surrendered to the Americans south of Schwerin on 2 May 1945.

On 22 January 1945, Red Army soldiers killed over 100 unarmed men of the 5th Battalion of the 1st Construction Regiment in the Dąbrówka Nowa Massacre after mistakenly assuming that they were armed.

Commanders
SS-Brigadeführer und Generalmajor Peter Hansen (25 February 1943 – 1 May 1943)
SS-Gruppenführer und Generalmajor Carl Graf von Pückler-Burghauss (1 May 1943 – 17 February 1944)
SS-Oberführer Nikolaus Heilmann (17 February 1944 – 21 July 1944)
SS-Oberführer Herbert von Obwurzer (21 July 1944 – 26 January 1945)
SS-Oberführer Adolf Ax (26 January 1945 – 15 February 1945)
SS-Oberführer, later Brigadeführer und Generalmajor Karl Burk (15 February – 2 May 1945)

Order of battle
Waffen Grenadier Regiment of SS 32
Waffen Grenadier Regiment of SS 33
Waffen Grenadier Regiment of SS 34
Waffen Artillery Regiment of SS 15
Waffen Füsilier Battalion of SS 15
Waffen Flak Battalion of SS 15
Waffen Signals Battalion of SS 15
Waffen Pionier Battalion of SS 15
Waffen Panzerjäger Battalion of SS 15
SS Medical Battalion 15
SS Nachschub Troop 15
SS Feldpost Department 15
SS Veterinary Company 15
SS Wirtschafts Battalion 15
SS Bau Regiment 1 of 15. SS-Division
SS Bau Regiment 2 of 15. SS-Division
SS Feldersatz Battalion 15
SS Waffen Feldgendarmerie Troop 15
SS War Reporter Troop 15

See also
 List of Waffen-SS units
 Ranks and insignia of the Waffen-SS
 Waffen-SS foreign volunteers and conscripts
 Vilis Hāzners
 Dąbrówka Nowa Massacre

References 

15
Latvian Legion
Foreign conscript units of the Waffen-SS
Infantry divisions of the Waffen-SS
Military history of Latvia during World War II
Military units and formations established in 1943
Military units and formations disestablished in 1945
Generalbezirk Lettland